Admiral White may refer to:

David E. White (born 1938), U.S. Navy rear admiral
Hugo White (1939–2014), British Royal Navy admiral
John Chambers White (c. 1770–1845), British Royal Navy vice admiral
Jonathan White (admiral) (born c. 1957), U.S. Navy admiral
Peter White (Royal Navy officer) (1919–2010), British Royal Navy admiral
Steven A. White (1928–2021), U.S. Navy admiral
Timothy J. White (fl. 1980s–2020s), U.S. Navy vice admiral

See also
Admiral of the White, a former senior rank of the British Royal Navy
White admiral (disambiguation)